Dinamo Tbilisi's  second season in the Umaglesi Liga.

Season report

Dinamo Tbilisi played by the name FC Iberia Tbilisi.

Current squad

Statistics

Appearances, goals and disciplinary record

Umaglesi Liga

League table

Matches

External links 
 Archive of FC Dinamo Tbilisi matches by seasons

FC Dinamo Tbilisi seasons
Din